Charles Jacques Huault de Montmagny (c. 1583 to 1599 – 4 July 1657) was governor of New France from 1636 to 1648. He was the first person to bear the title of Governor of New France and succeeded Samuel de Champlain, who governed the colony as Lieutenant General of New France. Montmagny was able to negotiate a peace treaty with the Iroquois at Trois-Rivières in 1645.

Born in Montmagny, Val-d'Oise, to Charles Huault (descended from a noble family headed by Jacques Huault, a counsellor under Henri II of France 1534 to 1580) and Antoinette Du Drac, Huault de Montmagny was educated by the Jesuits in Malta under the Order of the Knights Hospitaller in 1622. He later joined the navy and then became a member of the Compagnie de la Nouvelle-France, following the invitation of Cardinal de Richelieu in 1632.

His name 'Montmagny' roughly translated into the Iroquoian languages as "Onontio" (Great Mountain), a title which the Iroquois Confederacy used for all subsequent Governors of Quebec.

Late in his life he was commissioned by the Knights Hospitaller to oversee the Hospitaller colonies in the Caribbean.  His presence there was ineffective, since he was bogged down in power struggles with the sitting governor, Phillippe de Longvilliers de Poincy.  Montmagny died on Saint Christopher on 4 July 1657.

He became the inspiration of the character Montmagny by Cyrano de Bergerac in his novel L'autre Monde.

Honours
de Montmagny's legacy is found in the province of Quebec:

 Montmagny, Quebec (1966) – formerly located in the Montmagny County and now in Montmagny Regional County Municipality since 1982
 Montmagny Arena
 former provincial districts of Montmagny (1867–1972) and Montmagny-L'Islet (1972–2011)
 Montmagny Regional County Municipality are named after him.
 current federal riding of Montmagny—L'Islet—Kamouraska—Rivière-du-Loup (2003) – replaced Bellechasse—Etchemins—Montmagny—L'Islet (1996–2003)
 rue Montmagny are found in Sorel, Quebec, Quebec City, Laval, Quebec, Trois-Riveres, Quebec and Sherbrooke, Quebec
 avenue de Montmagny in Montreal
 Montmagny Airport and  Hôpital de Montmagny in Cap-Saint-Ignace, Quebec

See also

 Laurent Bermen
 Chateau St. Louis
 Fort Richelieu

References

External links
Biography at the Dictionary of Canadian Biography Online

Governors of New France
French nobility
1590s births
1657 deaths
17th-century Canadian politicians